The 2021 European U23 Judo Championships were an edition of the European U23 Judo Championships, organised by the European Judo Union. It was held in Budapest, Hungary from 5–7 November 2021. The final day of competition featured the inaugural U23 European Championships mixed team event, won by ream Georgia.

Event videos
The event will air freely on the EJU YouTube channel.

Medal overview
Source:

Men

Women

Mixed

Medal table

References

External links
 Results
 

European U23 Judo Championships
 U23
Judo
European Championships, U23
International sports competitions hosted by Hungary
European Judo U23 Championships